Atanas Bornosuzov (born 5 October 1979) is a former Bulgarian footballer who played as a midfielder. For Bulgaria U21, Bornosuzov was capped 22 times.

Career
Bornosuzov started to play football in Maritsa Plovdiv. After spending the first two years of his career in the little clubs Sokol Komatevo, Olimpik Teteven and Dobrudzha Dobrich, in 1999 Bornosuzov signed a contract with the Champion of Bulgaria for 1998–99 Litex Lovech. For four years in Litex he earned 106 appearances, scored 18 goals and won the 2001 Bulgarian Cup.

In January 2004, Bornosuzov transferred to Naftex Burgas for a fee of 100 000 €. One year later Atanas signed with Russian side Tom Tomsk.

In June 2006 he came to Levski Sofia. From January 2007 he played in FC Terek Grozny. On 1 July 2008 Bornosuzov signed with Al Salmiya from Kuwait. 3 months later, on 5 October, his compatriot Kiril Nikolov joined the club.

In February 2009 Bornosuzov returned to Bulgaria and signed with Cherno More Varna. For the Sailors, Bornosuzov earned 37 caps and scored 3 goals.

Awards
 Bulgarian Championship 1998–99
 Bulgarian Cup 2001

References

External links 
 Profile at Levskisofia.info 

1979 births
Living people
Bulgarian footballers
Bulgarian expatriate footballers
Association football midfielders
First Professional Football League (Bulgaria) players
Israeli Premier League players
Cypriot First Division players
Aris Limassol FC players
FC Akhmat Grozny players
PFC Litex Lovech players
Neftochimic Burgas players
FC Tom Tomsk players
PFC Levski Sofia players
PFC Cherno More Varna players
PFC Dobrudzha Dobrich players
FC Astra Giurgiu players
PFC Slavia Sofia players
FC Lokomotiv 1929 Sofia players
Expatriate footballers in Cyprus
Expatriate footballers in Russia
Expatriate footballers in Kuwait
Russian Premier League players
Al Salmiya SC players
Kuwait Premier League players
Bulgarian expatriate sportspeople in Kuwait
Bulgarian expatriate sportspeople in Cyprus
Bulgarian expatriate sportspeople in Russia